Titan Studios, Inc. was an American video game developer based in Seattle. Formed by Epic Games China in November 2008, it comprised the team of the former Fat Princess developer Darkstar Industries. Titan Studios was disestablished in June 2011 and was succeeded by Carbon Games and Fun Bits.

History 
Titan Studios was formed in Seattle as a subsidiary of Epic Games China on November 11, 2008. The studio's core team comprised the former Darkstar Industries team, which had been working on Fat Princess. The stated intent of the opening was to develop original games using Unreal Engine 3, as well as a massively multiplayer online game. Following the release of Fat Princess, Titan Studios acted in a supporting role for Epic Games China and ceased the production of original games. Titan Studios was disestablished in June 2011. Six core team members—Dawna Baltins, Weng Chen, Matt Endsley, James Green (Titan Studios' founder), Branimir Karadzic, and Ken Klopp—established the independent studio Carbon Games in July. Chris Millar, the team leader for Fat Princess, established Fun Bits to continue working on the franchise with Sony Computer Entertainment.

Games developed

References 

2008 establishments in Washington (state)
2011 disestablishments in Washington (state)
Defunct companies based in Seattle
Defunct video game companies of the United States
Epic Games
Video game companies disestablished in 2011
Video game companies established in 2008
Video game development companies